Jakob Valdemar Olsson Johansson (born 21 June 1990) is a Swedish former professional footballer who played as a defensive midfielder. Becoming the first player born in the 1990s to play in Allsvenskan while at IFK Göteborg, he went on to represent AEK Athens and Rennes before retiring at IFK Göteborg in 2021. A full international between 2013 and 2019, he won 18 caps for the Sweden national team and is best remembered for scoring the winning goal in the 2018 FIFA World Cup qualifying playoffs against Italy when Sweden qualified for their first FIFA World Cup in 12 years.

Club career

IFK Göteborg
Born in Trollhättan, Johansson's first club was Trollhättans BoIS. He was brought to IFK Göteborg, together with manager Jonas Olsson, from FC Trollhättan. On 27 June 2007, he became the first player born in the 1990s to have played in the top league of Sweden, Allsvenskan when he debuted for his IFK Göteborg.

AEK Athens
On 28 December 2014, Johansson signed a 3.5-year contract with AEK Athens. On 22 August 2015, he made his debut in Super League Greece helping his team AEK win 3–0 against Platanias. On 22 November 2015, he scored his first season goal with a header in AEK Athens' away win against Panthrakikos. On 21 December 2015, the 15th matchday of the season, he again netted with a header giving his club the lead in 2–1 home defeat against Levadiakos. He finished the 2015–16 season with seven goals, including a header against Panathinaikos in a 3–1 victory.

Johansson started the 2016–17 season as a key player for the team in midfield. In the late days of July 2017 AEK made a last effort to extend Johansson's contract, which is set to expire on 30 June 2018. On 20 August 2017, he scored in the opening match of the season against Panetolikos, which ended as a 2–0 home win. Johansson started the 2017–18 season as a key player for the team in midfield.

Rennes
He signed for the Ligue 1 club Rennes in the summer of 2018.

Return to IFK Göteborg and retirement
In 2020, he return to IFK Göteborg after six years abroad. On 22 June 2021, after suffering many injuries in the latest years, he decided at the age of only 31 to retire from professional football, citing his injuries as the reason that obliged him to retire.

International career
Johansson made his international debut in a friendly against North Korea on 23 January 2013. He made his competitive debut in a 2018 FIFA World Cup qualifier against France on 11 November 2016. On 10 November 2017 the Swedes won against Italy 1–0 in the 2018 FIFA World Cup Second Round first leg at the Friends Arena, and the only goal coming when Jakob Johansson drilled home from 20 yards, via a Daniele De Rossi deflection. On 13 November 2017, in the game where Sweden held on to force a goalless draw in the second leg at the San Siro to defeat the Italians 1–0 on aggregate in their Russia 2018 World Cup play-off, Johansson faced an anterior cruciate ligament injury that kept him out for 11 months. Consequently, he also missed the 2018 FIFA World Cup.

Style of play
Johansson was a box-to-box midfielder, with his stand-out features being his physical strength, marking, accurate passing and overall significance in build-up play.

Personal life
His older brother Rickard Johansson is a former goalkeeper.

Career statistics

Club

International

International goals
Scores and results list Sweden's goal tally first.

Honours
IFK Göteborg
Allsvenskan: 2007
Svenska Cupen: 2008, 2012–13, 2019–20

AEK Athens
Super League Greece: 2017–18
Football League: 2014–15 (South Group)
Greek Cup: 2015–16

Rennes
Coupe de France: 2018–19
Individual
Årets ärkeängel (IFK Göteborg player of the year as decided by the supporters): 2012

References

External links

1990 births
Living people
People from Trollhättan
Association football midfielders
Swedish footballers
Swedish expatriate footballers
Sweden youth international footballers
Sweden under-21 international footballers
Sweden international footballers
IFK Göteborg players
FC Trollhättan players
AEK Athens F.C. players
Stade Rennais F.C. players
Allsvenskan players
Super League Greece players
Football League (Greece) players
Ligue 1 players
Expatriate footballers in Greece
Expatriate footballers in France
Swedish expatriate sportspeople in Greece
Swedish expatriate sportspeople in France
Sportspeople from Västra Götaland County